The Women's Downhill in the 2017 FIS Alpine Skiing World Cup involved eight events, including the season finale in Aspen, Colorado (USA).  Defending champion (and eight-time discipline champion) Lindsey Vonn of the USA was injured during the first half of the season, leaving the championship race wide open. However, Slovenian skier Ilka Štuhec won the first three downhills of the season and ended up carrying a 97-point lead into the finals, meaning that all she needed was either to finish in the top 15 herself or for rising Italian skier Sofia Goggia, who was in second, not to win.  As it turned out, Štuhec won the final herself, clinching the discipline title.

The season was interrupted by the 2017 World Ski Championships, which were held from 6–20 February in St. Moritz, Switzerland. The women's downhill was held on 12 February.

Standings

DNF = Did Not Finish
DNS = Did Not Start

See also
 2017 Alpine Skiing World Cup – Women's summary rankings
 2017 Alpine Skiing World Cup – Women's Overall
 2017 Alpine Skiing World Cup – Women's Super-G
 2017 Alpine Skiing World Cup – Women's Giant Slalom
 2017 Alpine Skiing World Cup – Women's Slalom
 2017 Alpine Skiing World Cup – Women's Combined

References

External links
 

Women's Downhill
FIS Alpine Ski World Cup women's downhill discipline titles